Shanika S. Minor (born November 29, 1991) is an American criminal who spent time on the FBI Ten Most Wanted Fugitives list after the shooting and killing of a pregnant woman. Minor was added to the FBI’s Ten Most Wanted Fugitives list on Tuesday, June 28, 2016, for her alleged involvement in first-degree intentional homicide, first-degree intentional homicide of an unborn child, and unlawful flight to avoid prosecution. Minor was the 10th female to be placed on the FBI’s Ten Most Wanted Fugitives list.

Minor was arrested in Fayetteville, North Carolina on July 1, 2016. On August 24, 2017, she was sentenced to 30 years in prison.

References

1991 births
Living people
American people convicted of murder
FBI Ten Most Wanted Fugitives